Rock n Roll Alibis is the debut solo album by American alternative rock musician Chad I Ginsburg (CiG), best known as the guitarist and vocalist of the band CKY. Recorded at Ginsburg's home-based Studio CiG LA in Los Angeles, California, it was released on his own label Generation Overdone Records on July 7, 2015. All material on the album was written, performed, produced, recorded, mixed and mastered by Ginsburg ("Dead to You" credits two co-writers).

Background
Ginsburg started working on his first solo album after a failed attempt at reconciling with former CKY bandmate Deron Miller in early 2014. He worked on writing songs for the project for "nearly a year" and claimed that he ended up with enough material for multiple albums. For the recording of the album, Ginsburg claimed that he approached the process differently than he had in the past, starting with tracking bass lines rather than "lyric phrases and melody, then guitar".

Rock n Roll Alibis was officially announced on June 4, 2015 with the release of a trailer titled "The Interrogation" featuring a short clip of closing track "Murder Is Sympathy", which sees two police detectives (portrayed by Mike Capes and Rob Valletta) interrogating Ginsburg about the album. A second trailer titled "Mind of a Warrior" was released on June 19 and features a clip of an instrumental version of the track "Dead to You". The album was released on July 7, 2015.

CiG promoted his solo debut on a North American concert tour beginning in August 2015. Joining him in the band were bassist Ronnie Elvis James and drummer Dennis Morehouse. In 2021, Ginsburg remastered and reissued the album on digital streaming platforms with a previously unreleased track, "DTW".

Track listing

Notes
"Dead to You" features additional contributions by Armin Peterson and Albert Garrett.

Personnel
Credits adapted from the album's liner notes.
Chad I Ginsburg – vocals, guitars, bass, synthesizers, percussion, production, recording, mixing, mastering
Stik I Gizzards (Chad I Ginsburg) – drums
Ryan Harris – artwork
Vasily Pavdun – photography
Sam Evans – logo design

References

External links

2015 albums
Chad I Ginsburg albums